The Oppo Joy Plus launched at the end of April, 2015. The phone had the slogan "Leap Up, Reach Joy." One of the phone's key selling points was an improved touchscreen which utilized an "all-new touch IC chip" which would allow users to user the device while wearing gloves or wet.

References 

Oppo smartphones
Mobile phones introduced in 2015
Android (operating system) devices
Discontinued smartphones
Mobile phones with user-replaceable battery